Poprad-Tatry railway station is a break-of-gauge junction station serving the city of Poprad, in the Prešov Region, northeastern Slovakia.

Opened in 1871, the station forms part of the standard gauge Košice–Bohumín Railway, and is the junction between that line and the Poprad-Tatry–Plaveč railway, a standard gauge branch line. Poprad-Tatry is also the southern terminus of the metre gauge Tatra Electric Railway, and, as such, is a gateway to the High Tatras mountain range, a popular tourist destination.

The station is currently owned by Železnice Slovenskej republiky (ŽSR); train services are operated by Železničná spoločnosť Slovensko (ZSSK).

Location
Poprad-Tatry railway station is situated at Jiřího Wolkera, at the north western edge of the town centre.

History
The station was opened on 8 December 1871, together with the rest of the Žilina–Poprad section of the Košice–Bohumín Railway. Only four days later, upon the inauguration of the section to Spišská Nová Ves, it became a through station.

With the commissioning of the first part of the Poprad-Tatry–Plaveč railway in 1889, the station was transformed into a junction.

The metre gauge connection with the High Tatras was achieved on 20 December 1908, via Starý Smokovec.

On 25 March 1942, the first deportation of Slovak Jews left Poprad station for the Auschwitz death camp. The train that departed that day was carrying about 1,000 Jewish girls and young women. Most of the subsequent transports of Slovak Jews similarly departed from Poprad. By the end of 1942, when the transports were halted, over 58,000 Jews had been deported from Slovakia to Poland.

Following a renovation in the 1980s, the station reached its present form as a two level interchange station. An SKK 858 million modernization and extension of the 1980s renovations was carried out in 2006–2007.

Train services
Poprad-Tatry railway station is the junction of the following Slovakian railway lines:

180 Košice–Žilina (part of the Košice–Bohumín Railway)
183 Poprad-Tatry–Starý Smokovec–Štrbské Pleso (part of the Tatra Electric Railway)
185 Poprad-Tatry–Plaveč

Line 180 forms part of Pan-European Corridor Va, which runs from Venice in Italy to Kyiv in Ukraine, via Bratislava, Žilina, Košice and Uzhhorod.

Interchange
The station offers interchange with local buses.

Services

See also

History of rail transport in Slovakia
Rail transport in Slovakia

References

External links

 Poprad-Tatry railway station on vlaky.net 

Poprad
Railway stations in Prešov Region
Railway stations opened in 1871
Buildings and structures in Prešov Region
Holocaust locations in Czechoslovakia
Railway stations in Slovakia opened in the 19th century